The Brookings Institution, often stylized as simply Brookings, is an American research group founded in 1916. Located on Think Tank Row in Washington, D.C., the organization conducts research and education in the social sciences, primarily in economics (and tax policy), metropolitan policy, governance, foreign policy, global economy, and economic development. 

Brookings has five research programs at its Washington campus: Economic Studies, Foreign Policy, Governance Studies, Global Economy and Development, and Metropolitan Policy. It also established and operated three international centers in Doha, Qatar (Brookings Doha Center); Beijing, China (Brookings-Tsinghua Center for Public Policy); and New Delhi, India (Brookings India). In 2020 and 2021, the institution announced it was separating entirely from its centers in Doha and New Delhi, and transitioning its center in Beijing to an informal partnership with Tsinghua University, known as Brookings-Tsinghua China.

The University of Pennsylvania's Global Go To Think Tank Index Report has named Brookings "Think Tank of the Year" and "Top Think Tank in the World" every year since 2008. The Economist describes Brookings as "perhaps America’s most prestigious think-tank."

Brookings states that its staff "represent diverse points of view" and describes itself as nonpartisan, and various media outlets have variously described Brookings as centrist, center-left, liberal, or right-wing. An academic analysis of congressional records from 1993 to 2002 found that Brookings was cited by conservative politicians almost as often as by liberal politicians, earning a score of 53 on a 1–100 scale, with 100 representing the most liberal score. The same study found Brookings to be the most frequently cited think tank by U.S. media and politicians.

History

1916–1979

Brookings was founded in 1916 as the Institute for Government Research (IGR), with the mission of becoming "the first private organization devoted to analyzing public policy issues at the national level." The organization was founded on 13 March 1916 and began operations on 1 October 1916.

Its stated mission is to "provide innovative and practical recommendations that advance three broad goals: strengthen American democracy; foster the economic and social welfare, security, and opportunity of all Americans; and secure a more open, safe, prosperous, and cooperative international system."

The Institution's founder, philanthropist Robert S. Brookings (1850–1932), originally created three organizations: the Institute for Government Research, the Institute of Economics (with funds from the Carnegie Corporation), and the Robert Brookings Graduate School affiliated with Washington University in St. Louis. The three were merged into the Brookings Institution on December 8, 1927.

During the Great Depression, economists at Brookings embarked on a large-scale study commissioned by President Franklin D. Roosevelt to understand its underlying causes. Brookings's first president, Harold G. Moulton, and other Brookings scholars later led an effort to oppose Roosevelt's National Recovery Administration because they thought it impeded economic recovery.

With the U.S. entry into World War II in 1941, Brookings researchers turned their attention to aiding the administration with a series of studies on mobilization. In 1948, Brookings was asked to submit a plan for administering the European Recovery Program. The resulting organization scheme assured that the Marshall Plan was run carefully and on a businesslike basis.

In 1952, Robert Calkins succeeded Moulton as president of the Brookings Institution. He secured grants from the Rockefeller Foundation and the Ford Foundation that put Brookings on a strong financial basis. He reorganized it around the Economic Studies, Government Studies, and Foreign Policy Programs. In 1957, Brookings moved from Jackson Avenue to a new research center near Dupont Circle in Washington, D.C.

Kermit Gordon assumed the presidency of Brookings in 1967. He began a series of studies of program choices for the federal budget in 1969 titled "Setting National Priorities." He also expanded the Foreign Policy Studies Program to include research in national security and defense. After Richard Nixon was elected president in 1968, the relationship between Brookings and the White House deteriorated; at one point Nixon's aide Charles Colson proposed a firebombing of the institution. G. Gordon Liddy and the White House Plumbers actually made a plan to firebomb the headquarters and steal classified files, but it was canceled because the Nixon administration refused to pay for a fire engine as a getaway vehicle. Yet throughout the 1970s, Brookings was offered more federal research contracts than it could handle.

After Gordon died in 1976, Gilbert Y. Steiner, director of the governmental studies program, was appointed the fourth and acting president of the Brookings Institution by the board of trustees. As director of the governmental studies program, Steiner brought in numerous scholars whose research ranges from administrative reform to urban policy, not only enhancing the visibility and influence of the Brookings program in Washington and nationally, but also producing works that have survived as classics in the field of political science.

1980–2022

By the 1980s, Brookings faced an increasingly competitive and ideologically charged intellectual environment. The need to reduce the federal budget deficit became a major research theme, as did problems with national security and government inefficiency. Bruce MacLaury, Brookings's fifth president, also established the Center for Public Policy Education to develop workshop conferences and public forums to broaden the audience for research programs.

In 1995, Michael Armacost became the sixth president of the Brookings Institution and led an effort to refocus its mission heading into the 21st century. Under his direction, Brookings created several interdisciplinary research centers, such as the Center on Urban and Metropolitan Policy (now the Metropolitan Policy Program, led by Bruce J. Katz), which brought attention to the strengths of cities and metropolitan areas; and the Center for Northeast Asian Policy Studies, which brings together specialists from different Asian countries to examine regional problems.

Strobe Talbott became president of Brookings in 2002. Shortly thereafter, Brookings launched the Saban Center for Middle East Policy and the John L. Thornton China Center. In 2006, Brookings announced the establishment of the Brookings-Tsinghua Center in Beijing. In July 2007, Brookings announced the creation of the Engelberg Center for Health Care Reform to be directed by senior fellow Mark McClellan, and in October 2007 the creation of the Brookings Doha Center directed by fellow Hady Amr in Qatar. During this period the funding of Brookings by foreign governments and corporations came under public scrutiny (see Funding controversies below).

In 2011, Talbott inaugurated the Brookings India Office.

In October 2017, former general John R. Allen became the eighth president of Brookings. Allen resigned on June 12, 2022, amid an FBI foreign lobbying investigation.

As of June 30, 2019, Brookings had an endowment of $377.2 million.

Publications
Brookings as an institution produces an Annual Report. The Brookings Institution Press publishes books and journals from the institution's own research as well as authors outside the organization. The books and journals it publishes include Brookings Papers on Economic Activity, Brookings Review (1982–2003), America Unbound: The Bush Revolution in Foreign Policy, Globalphobia: Confronting Fears about Open Trade, India: Emerging Power, Through Their Eyes, Taking the High Road, Masses in Flight, US Public Policy Regarding Sovereign Wealth Fund Investment in the United States and Stalemate. In addition, books, papers, articles, reports, policy briefs and opinion pieces are produced by Brookings research programs, centers, projects and, for the most part, by experts. Brookings also cooperates with the Lawfare Institute in publishing the Lawfare blog.

Policy influence
Brookings traces its history to 1916 and has contributed to the creation of the United Nations, the Marshall Plan, and the Congressional Budget Office, as well as to the development of influential policies for deregulation, broad-based tax reform, welfare reform, and foreign aid. The annual think tank index published by Foreign Policy ranks it the number one think tank in the U.S. and the Global Go To Think Tank Index believes it is the number one such tank in the world. Moreover, in spite of an overall decline in the number of times information or opinions developed by think tanks are cited by U.S. media, of the 200 most prominent think tanks in the U.S., the Brookings Institution's research remains the most frequently cited.

In a 1997 survey of congressional staff and journalists, Brookings ranked as the most influential and first in credibility among 27 think tanks considered. Yet "Brookings and its researchers are not so concerned, in their work, in affecting the ideological direction of the nation" and rather tend "to be staffed by researchers with strong academic credentials". Along with the Council on Foreign Relations and Carnegie Endowment for International Peace, Brookings is generally considered one of the most influential policy institutes in the U.S.

Political stance
As a 501(c)(3) nonprofit organization, Brookings describes itself as independent and nonpartisan. A 2005 UCLA study concluded it was "centrist" because it was referenced as an authority almost equally by both conservative and liberal politicians in congressional records from 1993 to 2002. The New York Times has called Brookings liberal, liberal-centrist, and centrist. The Washington Post has called Brookings centrist, liberal, and center-left. The Los Angeles Times called Brookings liberal-leaning and centrist before opining that it did not believe such labels mattered.

In 1977, Time magazine called Brookings the "nation's pre-eminent liberal think tank". Newsweek has called it centrist and Politico has used the term "center-left".

The media watchdog group Fairness and Accuracy in Reporting, which describes itself as "progressive", has called Brookings "centrist", "conservative", and "center-right".

Journalists at The Atlantic and Salon have argued that Brookings foreign policy scholars were overly supportive of Bush administration policies abroad.

Brookings scholars have served in Republican and Democratic administrations, including Mark McClellan, Ron Haskins and Martin Indyk.

Brookings's board of trustees is composed of 53 trustees and more than three dozen honorary trustees, including Kenneth Duberstein, a former chief of staff to Ronald Reagan. Aside from political figures, the board of trustees includes leaders in business and industry, including Haim Saban, Robert Bass, Hanzade Doğan Boyner, Paul L. Cejas, W. Edmund Clark, Abby Joseph Cohen, Betsy Cohen, Susan Crown, Arthur B. Culvahouse Jr., Jason Cummins, Paul Desmarais Jr., Kenneth M. Duberstein, Glenn Hutchins, and Philip H. Knight (chairman emeritus of Nike, Inc).

Starting with the 1990 election cycle, Brookings employees gave $853,017 to Democratic candidates and $26,104 to Republican candidates. In total, since 1990, 96% of its political donations have gone to Democrats.

Presidents
Since its incorporation as the Brookings Institution in 1927, it has been led by accomplished academics and public servants. Brookings has had eight presidents, including one in acting capacity. The current interim president is Amy Liu, who replaced Ted Gayer, who began serving on an acting basis since June 12, 2022.
 Harold G. Moulton, 1927–1952
 Robert D. Calkins, 1952–1967
 Kermit Gordon, 1967–1976
 Gilbert Y. Steiner (acting), 1976–1977
 Bruce K. MacLaury, 1977–1995
 Michael Armacost, 1995–2002
 Strobe Talbott, 2002–2017
 John R. Allen, 2017–2022
 Ted Gayer (acting), 2022-2022
 Amy Liu (acting), 2022–present

Notable scholars

Notable current and former Brookings scholars include former Federal Reserve chairs Janet Yellen and Ben Bernanke; former Federal Reserve vice chairs Donald Kohn, Alice Rivlin, and Alan Blinder; former chairs of the White House Council of Economic Advisers (CEA) Jason Furman and Martin Neil Baily; former CEA members Sandra Black, Jay Shambaugh, and James H. Stock; former director of the Congressional Budget Office Douglas Elmendorf; former US secretary of education Arne Duncan; former Assistant Secretary of State for Near Eastern Affairs Martin Indyk; dean of the University of Michigan's Ford School of Public Policy Susan M. Collins; former Federal Communications Commission chairman Tom Wheeler; Washington Post columnist E. J. Dionne; Wall Street Journal columnist William Galston; former NSC official Fiona Hill; and Eurasia analyst Igor Danchenko.

Research programs

Center for Middle East Policy
In 2002, the Brookings Institution established the Center for Middle East Policy "to promote a better understanding of the policy choices facing American decision-makers in the Middle East".

Brookings-Tsinghua Center for Public Policy

In 2006, the Brookings Institution established the Brookings-Tsinghua Center (BTC) for Public Policy as a partnership between the Brookings Institution in Washington, DC and Tsinghua University's School of Public Policy and Management in Beijing, China. The Center seeks to produce research in areas of fundamental importance for China's development and for US-China relations. The BTC was directed by Qi Ye until 2019.

21st Century Defense Initiative

The 21st Century Defense Initiative (21CDI) is aimed at producing research, analysis, and outreach that address three core issues: the future of war, the future of U.S. defense needs and priorities, and the future of the US defense system.

The Initiative draws on the knowledge from regional centers, including the Center on the United States and Europe, the Center for Northeast Asian Policy Studies, the Thornton China Center, and the Center for Middle East Policy, allowing the integration of regional knowledge.

P. W. Singer, author of Wired for War, serves as Director of the 21st Century Defense Initiative, and Michael O'Hanlon serves as Director of Research. Senior Fellow Stephen P. Cohen and Vanda Felbab-Brown are also affiliated with 21CDI.

WashU at Brookings
Under MacLaury's leadership in the 1980s, the Center for Public Policy Education (CPPE) was formed to develop workshop conferences and public forums to broaden the audience for research programs. In 2005, the center was renamed the Brookings Center for Executive Education (BCEE), which was shortened to Brookings Executive Education (BEE) with the launch of a partnership with the Olin Business School at Washington University in St. Louis. The academic partnership is now known as "WashU at Brookings".

Centers
Anne T. And Robert M. Bass Center For Transformative Placemaking
 Brown Center on Education Policy
 Centennial Scholar Initiative
 Center for 21st Century Security and Intelligence
 Center for East Asia Policy Studies
 Center for Effective Public Management
 Center for Health Policy
 Center for Middle East Policy
 Center for Technology Innovation
 Center for Universal Education
 Center on Children and Families
 Center on Social Dynamics and Policy
 Center on the United States and Europe
 John L. Thornton China Center
 The Hutchins Center on Fiscal and Monetary Policy
 Urban-Brookings Tax Policy Center

Funders

Funding details
As of 2017 the Brookings Institution had assets of $524.2 million. Its largest contributors include the Bill & Melinda Gates Foundation, the William and Flora Hewlett Foundation, the Hutchins Family Foundation, JPMorgan Chase, the LEGO Foundation, David Rubenstein, State of Qatar, and John L. Thornton.

Funding details as of 2017:

Funding controversies
A 2014 investigation by The New York Times found Brookings to be among more than a dozen Washington research groups and think tanks to have received payments from foreign governments while encouraging American government officials to support policies aligned with those foreign governments' agendas. The Times published documents showing that Brookings accepted grants from Norway with specific policy requests and helped it gain access to U.S. government officials, as well as other "deliverables". In June 2014, Norway agreed to make an additional $4 million donation to Brookings. Several legal specialists who examined the documents told the paper that the language of the transactions "appeared to necessitate Brookings filing as a foreign agent" under the Foreign Agent Registration Act.

The Qatari government, named by The New York Times as "the single biggest foreign donor to Brookings", reportedly made a $14.8 million, four-year contribution in 2013. A former visiting fellow at a Brookings affiliate in Qatar reportedly said that "he had been told during his job interview that he could not take positions critical of the Qatar government in papers". Brookings officials denied any connection between the views of their funders and their scholars' work, citing reports that questioned the Qatari government's education reform efforts and criticized its support of militants in Syria. But Brookings officials reportedly acknowledged that they meet with Qatari government officials regularly.

In 2018, The Washington Post reported that Brookings accepted funding from Huawei from 2012 to 2018. A report by the Center for International Policy's Foreign Influence Transparency Initiative of the top 50 think tanks on the University of Pennsylvania's Global Go-To Think Tanks rating index found that between 2014 and 2018, Brookings received the third-highest amount of funding from outside the United States compared to other think tanks, with a total of more than $27 million.

In 2022, Brookings president John R. Allen resigned amid an FBI probe into lobbying on behalf of Qatar.

Buildings
The main building of the Institution was erected in 1959 on 1775 Massachusetts Avenue. In 2009, Brookings acquired a building across the street, a former mansion built by the Ingalls family in 1922 on a design by Jules Henri de Sibour. This extension now houses the office of the President of the Brookings Institution.

Collaborations

Timbuktu Renaissance

After Islamist militants associated with Al-Qaeda attacked Timbuktu, Mali, in 2012, Manny Ansar, founding director of the Festival au Désert, collaborated with American music producer Chris Shields, Malian social entrepreneur Salif Romano Niang, and former American ambassador Cynthia Schneider to found the Timbuktu Renaissance (TR). The Timbuktu Renaissance launched in June 2014 at the Brookings Institution's US-Islamic World Forum in Doha, Qatar. Artists, scholars, and cultural leaders (including Vieux Farka Touré and Abdel Kader Haidara, the "bad-ass librarian of Timbuktu") met with government leaders (including the newly elected president, Ibrahim Boubacar Keïta), along with American counterparts, to develop a strategy using Mali's music and cultural heritage to help the city recover from conflict.

The initiative "seeks to boost Mali's creative industries, such as tourism, literature, architecture, music, film and art, as well as mobilize investment for sustainable economic development in areas including education, agriculture, renewable energy and natural resources". Google Arts & Culture has worked with TR and Haidara to digitize the manuscripts the librarians saved. TR's first public concert was given in December 2017, thereafter taking place each month. It also produces albums and runs  residencies for musicians.

See also

 List of think tanks in the United States

References

Citations

Sources

 Abelson, Donald E. Do Think Tanks Matter?: Assessing the Impact of Public Policy Institutes (2009).
 Weidenbaum, Murray L. The Competition of Ideas: The World of the Washington Think Tanks (2011).
 Boyd, Paxton F.Do Think Tanks Matter?: Assessing the Impact of Public Policy Institutes (2009).
 Shpilsky, Benjamin E. "Do Think Tanks Matter: Assessing the Impact of Public Policy Institutes'' (2009).

External links

 
 

 
1916 establishments in Washington, D.C.
Dupont Circle
Embassy Row
Foreign policy and strategy think tanks in the United States
Nonpartisan organizations in the United States
Organizations established in 1916
Political and economic think tanks in the United States
Think tanks based in Washington, D.C.